Pteropyrum is a genus of plants in the family Polygonaceae. Plants of the World Online accepts two species, native to Iran, Oman and the Gulf States.

Description
Species of Pteropyrum are shrubs. The few leaves may be arranged alternately or in bundles (fascicled). The ochrea is short. The flowers are small and bisexual, with five tepals, two outer and three inner, the three inner clasping the fruit when it forms. There are eight stamens. The ovary is three-angled with three styles. The fruit has three broad wings.

Taxonomy
The genus was erected by Hippolyte François Jaubert and Édouard Spach in 1844. It is placed in the subfamily Polygonoideae, tribe Calligoneae, along with its sister genus Calligonum.

Species
, sources varied considerably in the number of species assigned to the genus. Plants of the World Online accepted the following two species:
Pteropyrum aucheri Jaub. & Spach (synonym Pteropyrum ericoides Boiss.)
Pteropyrum scoparium Jaub. & Spach

Other sources listed more species, some with an "unresolved" status. These include:
Pteropyrum olivieri Jaub. & Spach (synonyms Pteropyrum gracile Boiss., Pteropyrum griffithii Meisn.)
Pteropyrum naufelum Al-Khayat

References

Polygonoideae
Polygonaceae genera
Flora of Iran
Flora of Oman
Flora of the Gulf States
Taxa named by Hippolyte François Jaubert